Yevgenia Belorusets is a photographer and writer from Ukraine. In 2020 she won the Haus der Kulturen der Welt International Literature Award.

Biography 
Belorusets is part of the curatorial group Hudrada and is co-founder of the journal Prostory. She is known for her reportage with Der Spiegel and Isolarii.

Belorusets has been reporting on her experiences of being in Kyiv during the military attacks from Russia in 2022. In an interview with Deutsche Welle, she described how she wanted "to keep writing, keep telling stories. And do what I can do, here and now. I can't really plan anything in this situation."

Bibliography 
 Lucky Breaks, translated by Eugene Ostashevsky (New Directions, March 2022) 
 Modern Animal (Isolarii, July 2021) 
 Glückliche Fälle, translated by Claudia Dathe (Matthes & Seitz, 2019)
 Me and her (Pinchuk Art Center, 2018)
 Happy Fallings (IST Publishing, 2018)

References 

21st-century Ukrainian writers
Living people
Ukrainian photographers
Ukrainian women photographers
21st-century Ukrainian women writers
Year of birth missing (living people)